The Afghanistan national baseball team is the national baseball team of Afghanistan. The team represents Afghanistan in international competitions and is controlled by the Afghanistan Baseball Federation, which was founded in 2011.

The first official baseball game in Afghanistan was held in Kandahar Province in 2009, although earlier games might have been organized as early as 2002 or 2003.

Tournament history

Asia Baseball Cup

SAARC Baseball Championship

Recent fixtures and results

External links
 Afghanistan Baseball Federation on Facebook

References

National baseball teams in Asia
baseball
Baseball in Afghanistan